Antonio D'Alena (born 24 February 1998) is an Italian footballer who plays as a midfielder for  club Lucchese.

Club career

Torino

Loan to Renate 
On 17 July 2018, D'Alena was loaned to Serie C club Renate on a season-long loan deal. On 29 July he made his debut for Renate as a substitute replacing Andrea Doninelli in the 63rd minute of a 2–0 home defeat against A.C.Rezzato in the first round of Coppa Italia. On 16 September he made his Serie C debut for Renate as a substitute replacing Lorenzo Simonetti in the 79th minute of a 2–0 away win over Sambenedettese. In October 2018, D'Alena suffered an anterior cruciate ligament injury, he was in recovery until July 2019. D'Alena ended his loan to Renate with only 3 appearances, all as a substitute.

Imolese 
On 24 July 2019, D'Alena signed for Serie C club Imolese on an undisclosed fee and a 3-year contract with a buy-buck option in favour of Torino. On 4 August he made his debut for the club in a match won 4–3 at penalties after a 3–3 home draw against Sambenedettese in the first round of Coppa Italia, he played the entire match. Three weeks later, on 25 September, he made his league debut for Imolese as a substitute replacing Andrea Marcucci in the 61st minute of a 2–1 away defeat against Rimini. However, in September 2019, he has to undergo a meniscus cleaning operation. He returned in June 2020 as a substitute replacing Gabriele Ingrosso in the 80th minute of a 2–1 away win over Arzignano Valchiampo. On 21 October, D'Alena played his first match as a starter for the club in Serie C, a 1–1 home draw against Sambenedettese, he was replaced by Lorenzo Alboni after 66 minutes.

Lucchese
On 9 August 2022, D'Alena signed a one-year contract, with an option to extend, with Lucchese.

Career statistics

Club

Honours

Club 
Torino Primavera

 Campionato Nazionale Primavera: 2015–16

References

External links
 
 

1998 births
Living people
Sportspeople from the Province of Taranto
Footballers from Apulia
Italian footballers
Association football midfielders
Serie C players
A.S. Roma players
Frosinone Calcio players
Torino F.C. players
A.C. Renate players
Imolese Calcio 1919 players
Lucchese 1905 players